Eric DeWayne Gray (born November 4, 1999) is an American football running back for the Oklahoma Sooners. He previously played for the Tennessee Volunteers.

Early life and high school
Gray grew up in Memphis, Tennessee and attended Lausanne Collegiate School. He was named Tennessee Mr. Football after rushing for 2,251 yards and 38 touchdowns in his sophomore season. As a junior, Gray rushed for 3,151 yards and 45 touchdowns and was selected the Tennessee Gatorade Football Player of the Year and repeated as Tennessee Mr. Football. Rated a four-star recruit, he initially committed to play college football at Michigan during the summer going into his senior year. He was named the Gatorade Football Player of the Year a second time and Mr. Football for a third straight season as a senior. Towards the end of his senior season, Gray decommitted from Michigan and reopened his recruitment. He ultimately committed to play at Tennessee a few weeks later.

College career
As a true freshman, Gray gained 539 yards and scored four touchdowns on 101 carries and caught 13 passes for 115 yards and a touchdown. He rushed for 246 yards, a school record for a freshman, and three touchdowns in the Volunteers final regular season game against Vanderbilt and was named the Southeastern Conference Freshman of the Week. Gray lead Tennessee with 772 rushing yards and four touchdowns on 157 attempts and also gained 254 yards and scored two touchdowns on 30 receptions. In January 2021, Gray announced that he was entering the transfer portal.

Gray chose to transfer to the University of Oklahoma.

References

External links
Tennessee Volunteers bio

Living people
American football running backs
Tennessee Volunteers football players
Players of American football from Tennessee
African-American players of American football
21st-century African-American sportspeople
1999 births
Oklahoma Sooners football players